Newall Glacier is a glacier in the east part of the Asgard Range of Victoria Land, flowing east between Mount Newall and Mount Weyant into the Wilson Piedmont Glacier.

The glacier was mapped by the New Zealand Northern Survey Party of the Commonwealth Trans-Antarctic Expedition, 1956–58, who named it after nearby Mount Newall. The crag was named by the Advisory Committee on Antarctic Names in 1997 for Japanese geophysicist Katsutada Kaminuma, Professor of Earth Sciences at the National Institute of Polar Research, Tokyo.

References 

Glaciers of the Asgard Range
McMurdo Dry Valleys